Englesea-Brook is a small rural village in the unitary authority of Cheshire East and the ceremonial county of Cheshire, England. Located close to Crewe, and to junction 16 of the M6 motorway. One of the main points of interest is Englesea Brook Chapel and Museum, one of the earliest chapels of the Primitive Methodist movement, and a museum of the working-class religious movement, Primitive Methodism.

External links
 Website about the museum

Villages in Cheshire